Senator Kehoe may refer to:

Christine Kehoe (born 1950), California State Senate
James J. Kehoe (1863–1909), New York State Senate
Kevin Kehoe (Illinois politician), Illinois State Senate
L. Paul Kehoe (born 1938), New York State Senate
Mike Kehoe (born 1962), Missouri State Senate